K. Pappu (died 11 July 2005) was an Indian film director, producer and screenwriter. He directed films such as Ucha Dar Babe Nanak Da (1982), Jigri Yaar (1984), Mohabbat Ki Kasam (1986), Vishnu-Devaa (1991), Ayee Milan Ki Raat (1991), Izzat Ki Roti (1993), Maha Shaktishaali (1994) and Raghuveer (1995).

References

External links
 

20th-century Indian film directors
Hindi film producers
Indian male screenwriters
2005 deaths
Year of birth missing
20th-century Indian screenwriters
20th-century Indian male writers